Kernersville Depot is a historic train station located at Kernersville, Forsyth County, North Carolina.  It was built by the Northwestern North Carolina Railroad in 1873. It is a plain one-story, mortise-and-tenon gable roofed building sheathed in board-and-batten siding in the Late Victorian style.  It served as a depot until a new station was built in 1901.  After that, it provided storage for the railroad and later for a farm and feed business.

It was listed on the National Register of Historic Places in 1988.

References

Buildings and structures in Forsyth County, North Carolina
Railway stations in the United States opened in 1873
Railway stations on the National Register of Historic Places in North Carolina
National Register of Historic Places in Forsyth County, North Carolina
Victorian architecture in North Carolina
Former railway stations in North Carolina